Eleanor M. Campobasso (August 9, 1923 - May 1998) was an American Democratic politician from Arlington, Massachusetts. She represented the 10th Middlesex district in the Massachusetts House of Representatives from 1965 to 1978.

References

1923 births
1998 deaths
Members of the Massachusetts House of Representatives
Women state legislators in Massachusetts
20th-century American women politicians
People from Arlington, Massachusetts
20th-century American politicians